Out of Focus was a German Krautrock rock fusion band, formed in late-1968 in Munich, with Hennes Herring on keyboards (mainly the Hammond organ), Remigius Drechsler on guitars, Hans-Georg "Moran" Neumüller on vocals and winds, Klaus Spöri on drums and Stefan Wisheu on bass.

Out of Focus took their name from a Blue Cheer track, but had also been influenced by Soft Machine and Xhol Caravan, and rapidly established a distinctive style blending rock, jazz and psychedelic overtones. The band's music was known for the socio-political commentary present in Moran Neumüller's songs. Although typically Munich styled (with Embryo and Sahara connections) they are often compared to Canterbury fusion and Scandinavian jazz-rock acts.
After Out of Focus split up, bandleader Remigius Drechsler joined Embryo in the fall of 1979 for about one year before establishing his own project, Kontrast.

Discography
Wake Up (1971) (Different Guitarist)
Out of Focus (1971)
Four Letter Monday Afternoon (1972)
Not Too Late (1999 )
Rat Roads (2002 )
Palermo (2008 )

References

German musical groups